Lisa Hageman Yahgulanaas (also) is a Haida weaver. Based in Masset, the artist has won multiple awards in British Columbia.

Weaving style 
Yahgulanaas specializes in Yelth Koo (Raven's Tail), a traditional geometric weaving style. In 2014, ARTnews reported that textiles and regalia woven by her "have a distinctively modernist edge."

Recognition 
In 2010, Yahgulanaas was one of six First Nations artists to receive the BC Creative Achievement Award for First Nations Art, awarded in recognition of an artist's entire body of work. She credited the award to the Hageman-7idansuu Robe, a robe she created in 2009 which was the first Haida robe in more than 150 years to use only the Z-twist technique.

In 2016, when visiting Haida Gwaii, Prince William and Duchess Kate wore scarves woven by Yahgulanaas.

Also in 2010, Yahgulanaas received an award of excellence from the World Art Market at the Museum of Anthropology at UBC for her Woven Sea Robe, which combined the traditional Raven's Tail weaving technique with modern button blanket and appliqué styles.

From July 23 to October 4, 2020, Yahgulanaas' robe Raining Gold was featured in Àbadakone, an exhibition of indigenous art at the National Gallery of Canada. In 2021, Yahgulanaas was commissioned by the National Gallery of Canada to weave a chief's robe, a dance apron, and leggings as part of its Re-Creation project.

Personal life 
A member of the Yahgulanaas clan within the Dadens Raven moiety of the Haida, Lisa Hageman Yahgulanaas is descended from a family of Haida weavers. She is from Haida Gwaii and is based in Masset.

References 

Haida artists
Canadian weavers
Year of birth missing (living people)
Living people